The external limiting membrane (or outer limiting membrane) is one of the ten distinct layers of the retina of the eye. It has a network-like structure and is situated at the bases of the rods and cones.

Additional images

See also
Retina

External links
 
 https://web.archive.org/web/20050313111150/http://www.med.uiuc.edu/histo/small/atlas/objects/126.htm
 Slide at uc.edu
 http://www.kumc.edu/instruction/medicine/anatomy/histoweb/eye_ear/eye12.htm 
 https://web.archive.org/web/20070518033845/http://education.vetmed.vt.edu/Curriculum/VM8054/EYE/RETINA.HTM

Human eye anatomy